In linguistics, a corpus (plural corpora) or text corpus is a language resource consisting of a large and structured set of texts (nowadays usually electronically stored and processed). In corpus linguistics, they are used to do statistical analysis and hypothesis testing, checking occurrences or validating linguistic rules within a specific language territory.

In search technology, a corpus is the collection of documents which is being searched.

Overview 

A corpus may contain texts in a single language (monolingual corpus) or text data in multiple languages (multilingual corpus).

In order to make the corpora more useful for doing linguistic research, they are often subjected to a process known as annotation. An example of annotating a corpus is part-of-speech tagging, or POS-tagging, in which information about each word's part of speech (verb, noun, adjective, etc.) is added to the corpus in the form of tags. Another example is indicating the lemma (base) form of each word. When the language of the corpus is not a working language of the researchers who use it, interlinear glossing is used to make the annotation bilingual.

Some corpora have further structured levels of analysis applied. In particular, smaller corpora may be fully parsed. Such corpora are usually called Treebanks or Parsed Corpora. The difficulty of ensuring that the entire corpus is completely and consistently annotated means that these corpora are usually smaller, containing around one to three million words. Other levels of linguistic structured analysis are possible, including annotations for morphology, semantics and pragmatics.

Applications 

Corpora are the main knowledge base in corpus linguistics. Other notable areas of application include:

 Language technology, natural language processing, computational linguistics
 The analysis and processing of various types of corpora are also the subject of much work in computational linguistics, speech recognition and machine translation, where they are often used to create hidden Markov models for part of speech tagging and other purposes. Corpora and frequency lists derived from them are useful for language teaching. Corpora can be considered as a type of foreign language writing aid as the contextualised grammatical knowledge acquired by non-native language users through exposure to authentic texts in corpora allows learners to grasp the manner of sentence formation in the target language, enabling effective writing.

 Machine translation
 Multilingual corpora that have been specially formatted for side-by-side comparison are called aligned parallel corpora. There are two main types of parallel corpora which contain texts in two languages. In a translation corpus, the texts in one language are translations of texts in the other language. In a comparable corpus, the texts are of the same kind and cover the same content, but they are not translations of each other. To exploit a parallel text, some kind of text alignment identifying equivalent text segments (phrases or sentences) is a prerequisite for analysis. Machine translation algorithms for translating between two languages are often trained using parallel fragments comprising a first-language corpus and a second-language corpus, which is an element-for-element translation of the first-language corpus.

 Philologies
 Text corpora are also used in the study of historical documents, for example in attempts to decipher ancient scripts, or in Biblical scholarship. Some archaeological corpora can be of such short duration that they provide a snapshot in time. One of the shortest corpora in time may be the 15–30 year Amarna letters texts (1350 BC). The corpus of an ancient city, (for example the "Kültepe Texts" of Turkey), may go through a series of corpora, determined by their find site dates.

Some notable text corpora

See also 

 Concordance
 Corpus linguistics
 Distributional–relational database
 Linguistic Data Consortium
 Natural language processing
 Natural Language Toolkit
 Parallel text alignment
 Search engines: they access the "web corpus".
 Speech corpus
 Translation memory
 Treebank
 Zipf's Law

References

External links 

 ACL SIGLEX Resource Links: Text Corpora 
 Developing Linguistic Corpora: a Guide to Good Practice
 Free samples (not free), web-based corpora (45-425 million words each): American (COCA, COHA, TIME), British (BNC), Spanish, Portuguese
 Intercorp Building synchronous parallel corpora of the languages taught at the Faculty of Arts of Charles University.
 Sketch Engine: Open corpora with free access
 TS Corpus – A Turkish Corpus freely available for academic research.
 Turkish National Corpus – A general-purpose corpus for contemporary Turkish
 Corpus of Political Speeches, Free access to political speeches by American and Chinese politicians, developed by Hong Kong Baptist University Library
 Russian National Corpus

Discourse analysis
Corpus linguistics
Computational linguistics
Works based on multiple works
Test items

lt:Tekstynas